Buryat alphabet can refer to:
 A Cyrillic alphabet: Cyrillic alphabets#Buryat
 A Mongolian alphabet also called Vagindra script